The Fitzroy Place was completed in 1893 and was designed by Fuller and Wheeler, New York architects, and was built in the Richardsonian Romanesque style that was extremely popular on the west coast. The architects were noted for the numerous educational buildings they designed in the United States and overseas.

Elizabeth Iliff Warren, widow of John Wesley Iliff, a successful cattle baron and Denver philanthropist, commissioned the mansion. He died in 1878 of gall bladder obstruction, leaving Elizabeth Warren, at 34, with four children, cattle, and a land empire.

The Fitzroy Mansion was named on the National Register of Historic Places in 1975 and designated a Denver Historic Landmark in 2008.

Name origin 
The Warren-Iliff Mansion, more commonly known as The Fitzroy Place, was named after the birthplace of Mrs. Warren.

History 
When Iliff Hall was started, construction had begun on a stone residence for the Warrens on South Cook Street. They had engaged the services of Fuller Wheeler, architects of Albany, New York. Though the plans for Iliff Hall have been lost, one would expect to have both buildings made with Lyons red sandstone and simultaneously designed by the same architects. They were, for William S. Iliff paid Fuller and Wheeler $1,750 for the architectural designs on June 10, 1892. For many years, it was believed that the architect had been Frank E. Edbrooke of Denver because it was known that he had designed many Denver homes of the period.

Fuller and Wheeler had offered to build the structure for "not less than $50,000," and by January 25, 1893, the total cost was $62,250.

Building statistics 
Behind the over one hundred different doors of the property, separating between three different buildings, is sixteen basement doors, twenty-eight first-floor doors, eighteen-second floor doors, twenty-one third-floor doors, and one fourth-floor door.

References 

National Register of Historic Places in Denver